Fortress of the Mutant Waffles is a game written for the TRS-80 Color Computer by Andrew Pakerski and published in 1983 by T+D Software. The goal is to collect 9 missing bottles of syrup and return them to the beginning in as little time as possible while avoiding mutant waffles. The green and black title screen plays a series of rapid beeps of various pitches, giving the illusion of bubbling syrup.

References

1983 video games
Maze games
TRS-80 Color Computer games
TRS-80 Color Computer-only games
Video games developed in the United States